Ek Duje Ke Vaaste 2 is an Indian Hindi-language romantic television series, based on Army background, aired on SonyLIV.  The series initially starred Mohit Kumar and Kanikka Kapur, until Kapur was replaced by Vidhi Pandya. The earlier episodes were also aired on Sony Entertainment Television. It is a spiritual successor of the series Ek Duje Ke Vaaste.

Summary

The show is set in Bhopal. Shravan Malhotra, a spoilt and indisciplined civilian teenager, sent to an army school to learn discipline where he meets Suman Tiwari, a fully disciplined and ambitious girl from an army family who is the daughter of Colonel Vijay Tiwari who is, in turn, Shravan's father Devraj's friend. Initially, both despise each other due to their different backgrounds.

Shravan dislikes the discrimination between army and civilian students and the conflicts this often leads to. Suman and Shravan are constantly at odds with each other as they try to prove the other's view wrong. However, despite their constant clashes, Shravan falls in love with Suman. He tries to confess his love to her but hesitates. Shravan's father has an argument with Suman's father, Vijay, and the two families grow to dislike each other. Several incidents take place, increasing this tension. Meanwhile, Suman learns about Shravan's feelings for her. She mistakes this to be just a teenage crush and decides to ask him to be her best friend instead. Shravan finally confesses his love to Suman. Hearing the confession, she decides not to remain in contact with him as she worries that not doing so will cause Shravan more pain, unaware that deep down, she has feelings for him as well.
Separately, Anish challenges Shravan by placing Suman's honour at stake. In order to defend her, Shravan takes up the challenge.
While the two are competing, Shravan falls from a high wall but Suman risks her own life and saves him. When questioned by Shravan about why she took such a huge risk just to save him, Suman is unable to answer and thus she realises how deeply she has fallen for him. The next day, she confesses her feelings for him. Later, they both go on a date where Suman was kidnapped and later saved by Shravan.
A huge misunderstanding breaks out between both their families due to which Shravan ends up pathetically begging Suman's grandfather to not take the matter further. Suman watches this scenario helplessly and later breaks down as she hates seeing Shravan beg. They meet at SuVan corner regularly to talk, study together, teach each other new things and give presents to each other. Later they permanently tattoo each other's name - Shravan on his chest and Suman on her back.

After months of secret love, they are finally discovered almost kissing by their families. Enraged, both families decide to send their children away so that they do not meet each other.
Shravan and Suman decide to elope so that they can buy time hoping their family will understand their true love for each other and accept their relationship.
Elsewhere, Vijay gets killed while fighting insurrectionists in a counterinsurgency operation. Suman regrets that she had been cold towards her father in their last meeting. Devraj is arrested on charges of making a low-quality bulletproof vest and goods for the army and is blamed for Vijay's death. Suman believes this and breaks up with Shravan, leaving him heartbroken.

After 7 years

Hatred has made both Shravan and Suman strangers to each other for the last 7 years. Shravan is a captain in the Dhar regiment of the Indian Army. He is considered a daredevil by his platoon. Unknown to him, Suman is now a Surgeon captain in the AMC. The once perfectly disciplined, obedient, and cheerful Suman has now evolved into a strict yet rebellious and unruly army doctor who does not bow down to anyone. Both now live in broken families- Suman's mother is no more and in her absence, Suman's once loving aunt now has property-related issues with Suman. On the other hand, Shravan is struggling to manage his father's legal complications as well as his uncle who is now a depressed divorcee. Also, Shravan's cousin, Avni, now lives with her mother and avoids Rajendra. On the other hand, Suman's lawyer, Vikram, is interested in Suman and tries to impress her.

Separately, both of them prepare for the final verdict of the case which was filed against Shravan's father by Suman's family long back. For the same, they return to their home town Bhopal, where they meet unexpectedly. It so happened that Suman's cousin brother Veer was saved by Shravan from a fatal truck collision, in which Shravan gets grievously injured. Ensuing their sudden meet, they cherish intense hostility and disdain for each other due to their past. To their dismay, the Military Hospital Commandant assigns Suman to treat Shravan. Meanwhile, Kanchan, Suman’s cousin sister, returns from her hostel, and Vikram befriends Shravan, who unknowingly helps Vikram impress Suman. Shravan also gets to know that Vikram and Suman are in a relationship, enraging him.

A few weeks later, the case verdict is out and Shravan wins the case. Suman is dejected because she feels that she couldn't give justice to Vijay. At Veer's birthday party, both Suman and Shravan confess their heart out and how much they missed each other during their difficult times. The confession turns into an argument as she still feels that the earlier punishment given to Devraj is not enough. The next day, Suman files the case again in the high court. Vikram notices the tiff between the two and thus Suman reveals their past relationship to Vikram but she mentioned it as a high school attraction. This irks Shravan and he vows to irritate Suman.

Shravan sells his house but is unable to find any alternative accommodation as he needs to stay for a few days more due to his recovering injury. Suman's aunt asks Shravan to stay as a paying guest in their house, to which he agreed. Sophie is then introduced. Sharavan and Sophie click instantly which makes Suman quite jealous. After an encounter with Vikram, Sophie tells Shravan that she is the ex-girlfriend of Vikram. Vikram is afraid that Suman might consider him a loser because Sophie had dumped him earlier and so, he does not turn up for the invited dinner which hurts Suman. Suman is taunted by Chachi. This makes Shravan sad and he helps Vikram realizing his mistake. Suman gets to know about this which increases her respect for Shravan. They start to have good care and bond again only to realize that they have been hurt by each other in the past and should not let their inner feelings take over. They decide to show each other that they have 'moved on' by getting closer to their respective partners.

During a wedding, Avni visits the Malhotra home once again and instantly realizes that Suman and Shravan still possess strong feelings for each other. 
Separately, Suman and Shravan each realize that they still love each other. On discovering that Shravan had helped him in her financial difficulties furtively, Suman discerns Shravan still cares for her and she vows to dig the truth. But before she could interrogate Shravan, she sees Shravan with Sophie and misconceives them to be dating. Dejected, she decides against confessing and to move on with some happy memories of time spent with Shravan. She even withdraws the judicial case against Shravan's father. On the other hand, based on Bunty's viewpoint, Shravan gets a hunch that Suman feels for her and attempts to divulge his love to the latter. But before he could confess, Suman accedes to Vikram's marriage proposal. It renders Shravan heartbroken and he determines to drift away from Suman as soon as possible so as to not cause any grief to either Suman or Vikram.

As Shravan has healed and is fit to join his command and resume his duty, he insists to scram away immediately. It agonizes Suman further as she craved for Shravan's company. Shravan's sudden departure devastates Suman. She meets with a minor road accident due to incautious driving and sprains her ankle. On hearing the news, Shravan succumbs to returning Bhopal in order to visit Suman.

Few day later, Suman's engagement is finalized with Vikram. However, on the day of engagement, Shravan proposes to Suman and she accepts, breaking the alliance with Vikram.

After lots of efforts, SuVan finally manages to get consent for their marriage from their respective families, and they get married. Suman becomes ADC Major Dr. Suman Malhotra and Shravan becomes Major Shravan Malhotra.

Although their marriage and love is tested several times, their true love for each other always prevails.

Cast

Main
 Mohit Kumar as Major Shravan Malhotra of the Dhar Regiment: Devraj and Kavita's son, Suman’s husband. He was a happy-go-lucky, affluent, indisciplined, and spoilt teenager from a civilian background. Later, he became Suman's love interest. However, after Vijay's death, both end their relationship. After the leap, he is a captain (later Major) in the Indian Army (Infantry). Shravan and Suman got married as they realise that they still love each other. (2020–2021)
 Kanikka Kapur as Major Dr. Suman Malhotra ADC (née Tiwari): Anjali and Vijay's daughter, Shravan’s wife. She was a disciplined, ambitious teenager who views the world from the army's perspective as she is brought up in a family of army officers. Later, she became Shravan's love interest. However, after her father's death, she slaps him, humiliates Shravan and his father and ends their relationship. After the leap, she is a captain (later Major) and doctor in the Indian Army Medical Forces  (AMC). (2020–2021)
 Vidhi Pandya replaced Kapur as Suman Tiwari. (2021)

Recurring
 Akshay Anand as Devraj Malhotra, Shravan's father, and Kavita's husband, is the CEO of a defense industry. He was Vijay's best friend but after a misunderstanding with Vijay, both families started to dislike each other. He faced humiliation from Mohan Tiwari. Tiwaris consider him responsible for Vijay's death as his company made bulletproof vests for army. He later is shown to be proven innocent and wins the case. After the leap he shown to hate Tiwaris and wants revenge. Later on, he accepts Suman as his daughter-in-law happily.(2020–2021)
 Mamta Varma as Kavita Malhotra is Shravan's mother and Devraj's wife. Like Anjali Tiwari, she is also a caring lady. She loves her family and especially her son Shravan and always supports Shravan. (2020)
Soni Shrivastava replaced Verma as Kavita Malhotra. (2020–2021)
 Takshi Negi as Avni Malhotra, Shravan's cousin sister. (2020)
 Twinkle Saini replaced Negi as Avni Malhotra. (2021)
 Rahul Parenja as Rajendra Malhotra, Devraj's brother, who was always at odds with Brigadier Mohan Tiwari. (2020)
Ahtesham Azad Khan replaced Parenja post COVID-19 lockdown (2020–2021).
 Bhavya Mishra as Ragini Malhotra: Rajendra's wife. (2020-2021)
 Jay Thakkar as Bunty, Shravan's best friend who helps him with various problems. He was a loyal friend of Shravan and was always standing by his side. After leap, helps Shravan to reunite with Suman. Kanchan's fiancee.(2020–2021)
 Nivedita Soni as Jhumri: Malhotras' housemaid, She is secretly married to Tiwar's househelp Damru. (2020–2021)
 Anurag Arora as Martyr Colonel Vijay Tiwari VrC SM: Suman's father and Anjali's husband, was a strict army officer who had received many bravery awards for his dedication towards his work. He was Devraj Malhotra's best friend but after having a misunderstanding with Devraj, both the families started to dislike each other. He died while fighting terrorists and Devraj was blamed for the former as his company produced low-quality bulletproof jackets and goods for Army. After the leap, he is shown to be in flashbacks and pictures (2020).
 Reema Vohra as Late Anjali Vijay Tiwari: Suman's mother and Vijay's widow. She was a very kind-hearted, calm, and composed lady. After the leap, she is shown to have died.
 Shubha Saxena replaced Vohra post COVID-19 lockdown. (2020).
 Ahmed Khan as Late Brigadier Mohan Tiwari (Retd.), Vijay and Ramesh's father, is a retired army officer. He is the patriarch of the Tiwari family. He is very strict by nature and looked down on civilians. He hated Malhotras and created a misunderstanding between Devraj and Vijay. After the leap, he is shown to have died. (2020)
 Khushi Mishra as Kanchan Tiwari, daughter of Ramesh Tiwari and Beena Tiwari and Suman's cousin sister. Initially, she had a crush on Shravan, but later supports Suman and Shravan's love enthusiastically and helps Suman realise Shravan's feelings. She is a very loving and supportive sister to Suman. After the leap, she is shown to have returned from the college hostel after her event management course and it is revealed that she was sent to a hostel because she helped Suman and Shravan to elope. She baselessly held Shravan responsible for all the mess and hated him. She wanted Suman to marry Vikram without knowing Suman's feelings. After knowing Suman's feelings, She helps Suman and Shravan to get married. Bunty's fiancee.(2020–2021)
 Shiv Chopra as Ramesh Tiwari: Vijay's brother and Kanchan and Veer's father. His father, Mohan Tiwari wanted him to become an army officer like Vijay but he failed to do so due to his asthma , which he sometimes regrets. He takes care of Suman after his brother’s death and now he has to provide for his family and take care of expenses. (2020–2021)
 Seema Saxena as Beena Tiwari: Ramesh's wife, Kanchan's and Veer's mother, and Suman’s aunt. She was a loving and caring aunt to Suman but after the latter’s parents' death, she gradually started having property related issues with Suman. She apologized to Shravan and his family because of Devraj winning the case. (2020–2021)
 Ghanshyam Tiwari as Damru: a home-helper at Suman's house and all Tiwari family treats him like a family member. He is secretly married to Malhotra's home helper, Jhumri. (2020–2021)
 Devansh Malviya as Veer: Suman's 8-year-old cousin. He is the brother of Kanchan and the son of Ramesh and Beena. He develops close friendship with Shravan.(2020–2021)
 Fahad Ali as Vikram Jaiswal, Suman's new lawyer and friend after the leap. He also becomes friends with Shravan. He was ex-boyfriend of Sophie. He is shown to be obsessed with marriage, and had developed one-sided love for Suman. He was very clingy and ultimately got rejected by Suman too.(2020)
 Taruna Nirankari as Sophie Matthews, Vikram's ex-girlfriend, Shravan’s friend, and also loved him one-sided. She is a wedding planner. Later on, She leaves Bhopal with a broken heart after discovering Shravan's love for Suman(2020)
 Nishant Raghuvanshi as Captain Anish Bhan, he belongs from a military family. He is Shravan's classmate and hates him for his undisciplined attitude. The hatred takes the form of hostility after he starts loving Suman. After a leap, he is now an army officer. (2020)
 Kashish Kanwar as Devika Sinha, Shravan's former girlfriend and Suman's friend. Shravan breaks up with her for the sake of his love for Suman after which Devika joins hands with Anish and plots against Shravan. After a leap, she married an army officer. (2020)
 Vipul Singh as Saheb, Shravan's civilian friend. (2020)
 Rushil Jain as Captain Nishant Bassi, Shravan's NDA Batchmate and friend (2020–2021)
 Vinay Vidhani as Lieutenant Saurabh Manwani, Shravan's junior in NDA and friend. (2020-2021)
 Unknown as Colonel Arvind Gujral SM, Suman's senior officer, and hospital commandant. (2020–2021)
 Shekhar Singh as Major Ronak Joshi, Suman's colleague in AMC regiment. (2021)
 Aarav Kanha Sharma as Ayaan, Avni’s fiancée. (2021)

List of episodes

Soundtrack

Production

Development and casting
When discussing the creation of a new version of Ek Duje Ke Vaaste, producer Dilip Jha said, "The response that we had received for Ek Duje Ke Vaaste was extremely overwhelming. The audience reception made us bring back season 2 of the show. But, it's with a different cast and a completely new twist in the story. The entire show will be shot in Bhopal, for which we have received great support from Madhya Pradesh Tourism."

Filming and airing
The production and airing of the show was halted indefinitely in late March 2020 due to the COVID-19 outbreak in India. Because of the outbreak, the filming of television series and films was halted in late March 2020 and expected to resume on 1 April 2020 but could not and the series was last broadcast on 31 March 2020 when the remaining episodes were aired. After three months, the production and filming of the series resumed in June 2020 and airing to resume from 20 July 2020.

The series started streaming exclusively on SonyLIV from 28 September 2020 to make way for Kaun Banega Crorepati 12 on Sony Entertainment Television.

Reception
Telly Updates described the show as "promising", giving it 3 out of 5 stars.

Mid-day.com also praised the show and listed five reasons to watch it.

References

External links
 Ek Duje Ke Vaaste 2 on IMDb
 Ek Duje Ke Vaaste – Season 1 and 2 on SonyLIV
 Ek Duje Ke Vaaste 2 Full Episodes Playlist on YouTube

Hindi-language television shows
Indian drama television series
Indian television soap operas
Sony Entertainment Television original programming
Sequel television series
Indian television spin-offs
2020s Indian television series
2020 Indian television series debuts